Balsam tree is the common name given to several genera or species of trees that are the source of resinous products, often known as balsam or balm.

Balsam tree may refer to:
Abies balsamea, balsam fir, the source of Canada balsam
Colophospermum mopane, an African leguminous tree with resinous seeds
Commiphora gileadensis, the source of Balm of Mecca, presumed to be the biblical Balm of Gilead
Daniellia oliveri, African copaiba balsam tree, a member of the genus Daniella
Myroxylon, the source of both Balsam of Peru and Tolu balsam
Populus sect. Tacamahaca, balsam poplars, the source of an ointment sold today as "Balm of Gilead"

See also
 Balsam (disambiguation)
 Balm (disambiguation)
 Resin